Now That's What I Call Music! 11 may refer to:
 Now That's What I Call Music 11 (UK series), released on 21 March 1988
 Now That's What I Call Music! 11 (U.S. series), released on November 19, 2002
 Now! 11 (Danish series), released on February 28, 2005
Now! 11 (Canadian series)
Now 11 (Portuguese series)